Jakub Černý (born March 5, 1987) is a Czech professional ice hockey player. He is currently a free agent.

He played with HC Litvínov in the Czech Extraliga for five seasons, from the 2006–07 Czech Extraliga season till the 2010–11 Czech Extraliga season. In 2011 he moved to TPS, which plays in the SM-liiga, the top professional ice hockey league in Finland.

Černý has played for the Czech Republic men's national under-18 ice hockey team in the 2005 IIHF World U18 Championships and for the Czech Republic men's national junior ice hockey team in the 2007 World Junior Ice Hockey Championships.

Career statistics

Regular season and playoffs

International

References

External links
 

1987 births
Czech ice hockey forwards
Living people
HC Litvínov players
HC Most players
HC TPS players
Yunost Minsk players
HC Karlovy Vary players
Piráti Chomutov players
HK Spišská Nová Ves players
People from Český Krumlov
Sportspeople from the South Bohemian Region
Czech expatriate ice hockey players in Finland
Czech expatriate ice hockey players in Slovakia
Czech expatriate sportspeople in France
Czech expatriate sportspeople in Belarus
Expatriate ice hockey players in Belarus
Expatriate ice hockey players in France